This is an order of battle listing the Japanese and Allied forces involved in the Battle of Milne Bay from 25 August – 7 September 1942.

Japanese forces

8th Fleet
 Vice Admiral Gunichi Mikawa

Assault Force
 Rear Admiral Mitsaharu Matsuyama

18th Cruiser DivisionRear Admiral Mitsaharu Matsuyama

29th Destroyer Division

23rd Submarine Chaser Division
CH-22
CH-24
Transport Group
Nankai Maru
Kinai Maru
Landing Force
5th Kure Special Naval Landing Force
5th Sasebo Special Naval Landing Force (part)
19th Establishment Unit (part)
8th Signals Unit (part)

Source:

Allied forces

Milne Force
Major General Cyril Clowes

 Headquarters
Headquarters, Milne Bay Force
Headquarters, Royal Australian Engineers, Milne Bay Force
Headquarters, Signals, Milne Bay Force
Headquarters, Australian Army Service Corps, Milne Bay Force

 Artillery
 9th Battery, 2/5th Field Regiment
 4th Battery, 101st Anti-Tank Regiment
 2/6th Heavy Anti-Aircraft Battery
 Section, 23rd Heavy Anti-Aircraft Battery
 Headquarters, 33rd Heavy Anti-Aircraft Battery
 440th Heavy Anti-Aircraft Gun Station
 441st Heavy Anti-Aircraft Gun Station
 2/9th Light Anti-Aircraft Battery (less E Troop), an Independent Battery of the 2/3rd Light Anti-Aircraft Regiment
 Detachment, Signals, 2/3rd Light Anti-Aircraft Regiment
 Detachment, 3rd Light Anti-Aircraft Workshop Section, 2/3rd Light Anti-Aircraft Regiment

 Engineers
 24th Field Company
 2/4th Field Company
 Detachment, No. 2 Dock Operating Company
 No. 5 Section, 1st Bomb Disposal Company

 Signals
 Headquarters Company, Milne Force Signals
 No. 1 Company, Milne Force Signals
 Headquarters No. 2 Company, Milne Force Signals
 Headquarters No. 3 Company, Milne Force Signals
 Detachment, New Guinea Force Signals

 Infantry
 7th Infantry Brigade Defence Platoon

 Supply and Transport
 25th Company, Australian Army Service Corps
 2/6th Company, Australian Army Service Corps

 Ordnance
 101st Independent Brigade Group Ordnance Workshop
 101st Independent Brigade Group Ordnance Field Park
 18th Brigade Section, 7th Division Ordnance Workshop
 18th Brigade Section, 7th Division Ordnance Field Park
 123rd Forward Ordnance Depot
 23rd Forward Ammunition Depot

 Medical
 11th Field Ambulance
 2/5th Field Ambulance
 101st Casualty Clearing Station
 308th Dental Unit
 368th Dental Unit

 Miscellaneous
 Detachment, Australian Defence Canteens Service
 Detachment, Australian New Guinea Administrative Unit

7th Infantry Brigade
 Headquarters, 7th Infantry Brigade
 J Section, Signals
 241th Light Aid Detachment
 9th Infantry Battalion
 25th Infantry Battalion
 61st Infantry Battalion
 7th Brigade Provost Section
 68th Field Post Office

18th Infantry Brigade
 Headquarters,  18th Infantry Brigade
 11 Platoon, Headquarters Guard Battalion
 J Section, Signals, 7th Division
 2/47th Light Aid Detachment
 2/9th Infantry Battalion
 2/10th Infantry Battalion
 2/12th Infantry Battalion
 5th Section, 7th Division Provost Company
 Detachment, 7th Division Postal Unit
 Detachment, 7th Division Field Cash Office

United States Army Units
 Platoon, 101st Coast Artillery (Anti-Aircraft) Battalion
 C Battery, 104th Coast Artillery (Anti-Aircraft) Battalion
 709th Airborne Anti-Aircraft Artillery Battery
 Company E, 46th Engineers
 43rd Engineers (less Headquarters and E Company)
 Port Detachment
 Company A, 394th Quartermaster Battalion
 Station Hospital

Allied Air Forces

RAAF
 No. 75 Squadron RAAF
 No. 76 Squadron RAAF
 RAAF Operating Base
 RAAF Signals
 No. 37 Radio Station

US Army Air Corps
 8th Fighter Control Squadron
 694th Signal Plotting Platoon

Source:

World War II orders of battle